Kohatk (O'odham: Kohadk name translates as "Hollow") is a census-designated place (CDP) in Pinal County, Arizona, United States, located in the northern part Tohono O'odham Nation reservation. The population was 31 as of the 2020 census.

Demographics 

As of the census of 2020, there were 31 people, 8 households, 6 families living in the CDP. The population density was 316 people per square mile. The racial makeup of the CDP was 93% Native American and 7% from two or more races. 7% of the population were Hispanic or Latino of any race.

Notes

Census-designated places in Pinal County, Arizona
Tohono O'odham Nation